Garrison Ground is a multi purpose stadium in Jabalpur, Madhya Pradesh. The ground is mainly used for organizing matches of football, cricket and other sports.  The stadium has hosted three first-class matches in 1953 when Madhya Pradesh cricket team played against Holkar cricket team. The ground hosted two more first-class matches from 1958 to 1962 but since then the stadium has hosted non-first-class matches.

References

External links 

 cricketarchive
 Wikimapia
 Cricinfo

Cricket grounds in Madhya Pradesh
Sports venues in Madhya Pradesh
Sports venues in Jabalpur
Multi-purpose stadiums in India
1953 establishments in India
Sports venues completed in 1953
Football venues in Madhya Pradesh
20th-century architecture in India